Zatrič or Zatriq is a fortress in Kosovo, whose ruins are located near the village Zatrić (old name: Zatrič), ten kilometers north of Orahovac. It is located at the top of Gradište, 1,013 meters above sea level, which dominates the valley of White Drin and Prizren.

Layout 
Zatrič consists of the upper town, located at the very top, around which down town was spread. Top Gradište has a shape that resembles a sharp tooth or beak, with southern and eastern sides protected by isolated and  sharp rocks that, in some places, reach up to 50 meters. On its north side, there is a natural plateau, on which research discovered ceramics and brick remains were discovered, contours of four-squared and polygonal facilities, and the basis of towers and ramps, which were connected the lower town to upper town.

History 
Historical records have no information on it, while Jastrebov believes that it was an old Byzantine fort, larger than in one Prizren, which could house thousands of people.

See also 
 List of fortresses in Kosovo
 List of fortresses in Serbia

References

Further reading 
 Иван Здравковић, „Средњовековни градови и дворци на Косову“, Београд, 1975.

External links 
 Zatrič, Cultural monuments in Serbia, Serbian Academy of Sciences and Arts

Historic sites in Kosovo
Protected Archaeological Sites
Forts in Kosovo
Medieval Serbian sites in Kosovo